This article lists various songs, albums, festivals, and performances of the year 2015 in Irish music.

Events
23 May - Molly Sterling represents Ireland in the Eurovision Song Contest 2015 with the song "Playing with Numbers".

Albums
Nathan Carter - Beautiful Life
HamsandwicH - Stories from the Surface
Kodaline - Coming Up for Air
Villagers - Darling Arithmetic

Singles
Rob Smith - "Dale Boca Juniors"

Performances/Festivals

Deaths
5 March – Jim McCann, 70, folk musician, throat cancer.
11 March – Tony Fenton, 53, radio presenter and DJ, prostate cancer.
13 April – Ronnie Carroll, 80, Northern Irish singer and political candidate.
27 May – Dennis Sheehan, 68, Irish music tour manager (U2), heart attack.
1 July – Val Doonican, 88, singer and television personality.

See also
2015 in music
Music of Ireland

References

External links 
 Irish Music Awards
 IMRO website
 IRMA website
 Hot Press website
 Music at The Irish Times
 Music at the Irish Independent
 Music news and album reviews at RTÉ